GeminiJets is a brand of model airplane specializing in 1:400 and 1:200 scales. The brn and was created by Airliners Distributing, Inc., which was founded in December of 1998 by Elliott Epstein. The company is based in Las Vegas, Nevada, United States. Gemini's first models were a set of 4 Boeing 747-400s, other models produced are aircraft produced by Boeing, Airbus, McDonnell Douglas, and Embraer. Intitially, GeminiJets released more retro models, sometimes more than models of current time. However retro models have become less frequent over time, but are still ocasionally released.

History 
In 1996, Elliot Epstein formed an agreement with a factory in order to prepare for production of diecast model aircraft. Gemini Jets began initial production in 1998 and delivered their first model, 4 Boeing 747-400s, in January of 1999. Following the first release other aircraft/ were made such as the L1011-1 and 500, A330, Concorde, B707, and B747-200.  

In 2003, Gemini Jets would move factories, and remove the tail seem from its models. to differentiate, models without the tail seem were dubbed "Gemini Jets II" outside the box. with the normal Gemini Jets logo being replaced with a modified logo titled "Gemini Jets II" 

In June 2007, The product line "Gemini200" was introduced. the models in this product line were bigger had rolling landing gear (albeit this was also introduced to Gemini400 at a later date). the first releases were all A320's and were of the colors of US Airways, PSA, British Airways, and Northwest Airlines.

In February 2020, due to COVID-19 lockdowns in China, GeminiJets temporarily halted production of diecast models.

Product Lines 
 GeminiJets 1:400 – Commercial aircraft and accessories at 1/400 scale
 GeminiMACS 1:400 – Military transport aircraft.
 Gemini Select 1:400 – Select commercial aircraft produced in lower quantities.  This line has been discontinued.
 Gemini250 – Commercial aircraft in 1:250 scale. The only line GeminiJets produced with retractable landing gear.  This line has been discontinued.
 Gemini200 – Commercial and military aircraft and accessories at 1:200 scale.
 GeminiACES 1:72 – World War II to present day military aircraft.  This line has been discontinued.
 Gemini Plastics Premiere - Commercial aircraft manufactured from plastic.  This line has been discontinued.
 Gemini General Aviation 1:72 - General aviation aircraft. as of January 2023 the only planes made is the Cessna 172, and Piper J-3 Cub.
Gemini Airport - Airport terminals, airport equipment and mats for 1:400 aircraft.

References

External links
Corporate Site

Companies based in Paradise, Nevada
Toy companies established in 1998
Model manufacturers of the United States
1998 establishments in Nevada